Łódź Marysin is a commuter railway station located in city of Łódź, in Bałuty district, Poland, on a loop line between Łódź Widzew and Zgierz stations, in the neighborhood of the former Radegast station. The station was constructed as part of the Łódź Commuter Railway and serves only ŁKA trains running from Łódź to Zgierz.

On 20 October 2019 the station was closed and since then is being expanded by rebuilding it into railroad turnout to increase the traffic rate on the line. Partial reopening of station took place in January 2020 after completion of works on the track switches. New platform was brought into service on 30 August 2020.

Future plans 
Another plan includes building a tram terminus in direct vicinity of the station (currently there is no bus or tram stop located nearby).

References 

Railway stations in Poland opened in 2014
Marysin
Railway stations served by Łódzka Kolej Aglomeracyjna